Grevillea lanigera, commonly known as woolly grevillea, is a species of flowering plant in the family Proteaceae and is endemic to south-eastern continental Australia. It is a spreading shrub with narrowly oblong to more or less linear leaves and clusters of pink to red, and cream-coloured flowers.

Description
The lower surface of the leaves is shaggy-hairy. Flowering mainly occurs from July to December, but flowers are sometimes present in other months.

Taxonomy
Grevillea lanigera was first formally described in 1830 by Robert Brown in his Supplementum primum Prodromi florae Novae Hollandiae from specimens collected near the Lachlan River by Allan Cunningham. The specific epithet (lanigera) means "wool-bearing".

Distribution and habitat
Woolly grevillea grows in moist, rocky places in scrub, woodland and forest, south from near Dubbo and east of the Riverina in New South Wales, mainly on the coast and tablelands through the Australian Capital Territory to eastern Victoria.

The species is variable in habit, features of the leaves and abundance of flowers, and forms hybrids with G. rosmarinifolia, G. polybractea and G. floribunda.

Use in horticulture
This grevillea is popular in cultivation and can be grown from seed or from cuttings. It is hardy in a range of climate and soil conditions. It is drought and frost hardy but prefers a sunny position in the garden.

References

lanigera
Flora of New South Wales
Flora of Victoria (Australia)
Flora of the Australian Capital Territory
Proteales of Australia
Taxa named by Robert Brown (botanist, born 1773)
Plants described in 1830